The Scandal is a 1923 British-French silent drama film directed by Arthur Rooke and starring Henry Victor, Edward O'Neill and Vanni Marcoux.

Cast
 Henry Victor as Artenezzo  
 Edward O'Neill as Jeannetier  
 Vanni Marcoux as Maurice Ferrioul  
 Adeline de La Croix as Mme. Ferrioul 
 Hilda Bayley as Charlotte

See also
 Le Scandale (1934)

References

Bibliography
 Palmer, Scott. British Film Actors' Credits, 1895-1987. McFarland, 1998.

External links
 

1923 films
1923 drama films
British drama films
British silent feature films
Films directed by Arthur Rooke
French silent feature films
British black-and-white films
British films based on plays
French films based on plays
French black-and-white films
French drama films
1920s English-language films
1920s British films
Silent drama films
1920s French films